August Blues Festival is a blues music festival held in Haapsalu, Estonia since 1994.

The festival takes place mainly inside the walls of Haapsalu Castle. It is the biggest blues festival in the Baltic states.

Besides Estonian blues musicians, there have been guests from United States and elsewhere.  Andy Fairweather Low, Nik West, Candye Kane, Earl Thomas, Omar Kent Dykes, Gene Taylor, Lucky Peterson, Lance Lopez, Coco Montoya, Kirk Fletcher, Jimmy Zavala, Eric Gales, Artur Menezes, and Duke Robillard have all performed at the festival.

See also

List of blues festivals
List of folk festivals

References

External links
 

Blues festivals in Estonia
Folk festivals in Estonia
Haapsalu
1993 establishments in Estonia
Music festivals established in 1993
Summer events in Estonia